Lily Quench is a series of children's novels written by Natalie Jane Prior and illustrated by Janine Dawson.

Novels in the series
Lily Quench and the Dragon of Ashby released 9 February 2004
Lily Quench and the Black Mountains
Lily Quench and the Treasure of Mote Ely
Lily Quench and the Lighthouse of Skellig Mor
Lily Quench and the Magicians' Pyramid
Lily Quench and the Hand of Manuelo
Lily Quench and the Search for King Dragon

There is also a companion book called Lily Quench's Companion and Guide to Dragons and the Art of Quenching.

Awards and nominations
2002 Lily Quench and the Treasure of Mote Ely shortlisted for the Aurealis Award for Best Children's Long Fiction
2003 Lily Quench and the Lighthouse of Skellig Mor won the Aurealis Award for Best Children's Short Fiction
2003 Lily Quench and the Magicians' Pyramid shortlisted for the Aurealis Award for Best Children's Short Fiction

References

See also
Jane and the Dragon

Series of children's books
Children's fantasy novels
Australian children's novels